This is a list of Ramsar sites in Turkey. As of April 2013, there are 14 Ramsar sites, which were designated between 1994 and 2013.

References

External links
Ramsar sites in Turkey

 
Turkey geography-related lists
Turkey